Busira may refer to:

 Busira River, a river in the Democratic Republic of the Congo
 Busira (Democratic Republic of the Congo), a village on the Busira River